Edmonton East (formerly known as Edmonton Centre-East) was a federal electoral district in Alberta, Canada, that was represented in the House of Commons of Canada from 1917 to 2015.

The district included a portion of the city of Edmonton.

Geography
The district at first was a far-flung mixed urban and rural riding that extended from the North Saskatchewan River into the Northland northeast of Edmonton. It covered the area stretching north and east of the connection of 101st Street and the North Saskatchewan River, in he middle of present-day Edmonton, all the way to the north boundary of Alberta.

In 1924 it was compressed to nearby farmland north of Edmonton (an area that is within the present limits of Edmonton), plus on the north side of the river the whole of Edmonton lying east of 101st Street, and on the south side of the river the area lying within Edmonton and east of the C&E line.

Later it became an urban riding within the City of Edmonton.

In 1966 it was in the area lying north of 98th Avenue and east of 101st Street.

In 1976 it was entirely on the northside and between Groat Road/109th Street and 97th Street.

History
This riding was originally created in 1914 as "Edmonton East" from Edmonton and Victoria ridings.  At the time of its creation, this district included a massive, sparsely-populated rural area.  Most of this area was removed due to the creation of Athabaska in 1924, and although it gained some back when Pembina riding was abolished in 1987, it is now an urban riding.

In 1924, it took in parts of the now-abolished Strathcona riding that had been within Edmonton city limits.

As Edmonton's population has grown, Edmonton East has also lost urban areas to new ridings.  Edmonton East lost area due to creation of Edmonton—Strathcona (1952), Edmonton Centre (1966), Edmonton North (1976), and Edmonton Northwest (1987).  It gained area due to the (temporary) abolition of Edmonton Centre in 1979.

In 2000, it was renamed "Edmonton Centre-East".  In 2003 Edmonton Centre-East was abolished and redistributed into a re-created Edmonton Centre, a new Edmonton East riding, and Edmonton—Sherwood Park.

The new "Edmonton East" riding was created from parts of Edmonton Centre-East and Edmonton North.

Members of Parliament
This riding has elected the following members of the House of Commons of Canada:

Election results

Edmonton East, 2004-2015

Edmonton Centre-East, 2000

Note: Canadian Alliance vote is compared to the Reform vote in 1997.

Edmonton East, 1997

	

	

	

Note: Social Credit vote is compared to New Democracy vote in 1940 election.

See also
 Edmonton East provincial electoral district
 List of Canadian federal electoral districts
 Past Canadian electoral districts

References

 
 
 
 Expenditures (2008)
 Expenditures (2004) - (2000) - (1997)
 Elections Canada
 Elections Canada Edmonton East Riding Information

Notes

External links
 CBC Edmonton East Riding Profile
 Website of the Parliament of Canada

Former federal electoral districts of Alberta
Politics of Edmonton